Zhang Ming'en (born 6 May 1995), is a Chinese actor. He made his official acting debut in 2016 with the tomb-raiding series The Mystic Nine.  He has also acted in the series Tientsin Mystic and Nice to Meet You.

Career 
Zhang Ming'en graduated from the prestigious Central Academy of Drama. During his school and early college days, he participated in some short films and a sitcom's bit part before officially debuting in 2016 with a memorable role as Adjutant Zhang Rishan in the tomb-raiding series The Mystic Nine. He went on to star in a spin-off of the series titled Tiger Bones Plum Blossom, which focuses on his character. In 2017, he acted in a highly acclaimed mystery fantasy web drama, Tientsin Mystic.

In 2018, Zhang reprised his role in the spin-off to The Mystic Nine, Tomb of the Sea.
His performance was well-received by viewers and received acclaim.
He was cast as the male protagonist for the first time in the romance supernatural drama, Destiny's Love.

In 2019, Zhang starred in the television series Nice to Meet You, the sequel to the 2017 hit drama Because of You. The same year, he starred in fantasy drama L.O.R.D. Critical World.

Filmography

Film

Television series

Television show

Discography

Awards and nominations

References

External links 
 
 

1995 births
Living people
21st-century Chinese male actors
Chinese male television actors
Male actors from Heilongjiang
Central Academy of Drama alumni